Akins is a census-designated place (CDP) in Sequoyah County, Oklahoma, United States. It is part of the Fort Smith, Arkansas-Oklahoma Metropolitan Statistical Area. The population was 493 at the 2010 census, an increase of 9.8 percent over the figure of 449 recorded in 2000.

The post office existed from February 16, 1894, until December 31, 1943. It is said to be named for Robert Akins, a mail carrier.

Sequoyah's Cabin, a national historic site, is located about two miles northeast of the town.

Akins is perhaps best remembered as the home of the Floyd family and Charles Arthur Floyd is buried in the Akins Cemetery. His funeral in 1934 attracted 20 thousand and maybe as many as 40 thousand people. As of 2013 it remains the most highly attended funeral in Oklahoma history.

Geography
Akins is located at  (35.507392, -94.668642).

Demographics

As of the census of 2010, there were 493 people residing in Akins. There were 197 housing units at an average density of 15/sq mi (6/km). The racial makeup of the CDP was 70.16% White, 1.56% African American, 15.81% Native American, 0.22% from other races, and 12.25% from two or more races. Hispanic or Latino of any race were 1.34% of the population.

There were 164 households, out of which 40.2% had children under the age of 18 living with them, 70.1% were married couples living together, 6.7% had a female householder with no husband present, and 18.9% were non-families. 15.9% of all households were made up of individuals, and 6.7% had someone living alone who was 65 years of age or older. The average household size was 2.74 and the average family size was 3.05.

In the CDP, the population was spread out, with 29.0% under the age of 18, 5.6% from 18 to 24, 30.3% from 25 to 44, 23.8% from 45 to 64, and 11.4% who were 65 years of age or older. The median age was 37 years. For every 100 females, there were 104.1 males. For every 100 females age 18 and over, there were 107.1 males.

The median income for a household in the CDP was $28,750, and the median income for a family was $27,143. Males had a median income of $22,083 versus $16,750 for females. The per capita income for the CDP was $11,996. About 18.0% of families and 20.6% of the population were below the poverty line, including 29.6% of those under age 18 and 12.5% of those age 65 or over.

References

Further reading
 Shirk, George H.; Oklahoma Place Names; University of Oklahoma Press; Norman, Oklahoma; 1987: .

Census-designated places in Sequoyah County, Oklahoma
Census-designated places in Oklahoma
Fort Smith metropolitan area